John Master (1637 – c.1680), was an English physician. He was the son of the politician William Master, brother of the clergyman and author William Master and assisted the medical author Thomas Willis.

References

1637 births
1680s deaths
17th-century English medical doctors